Ninne Preethisuve is a 2002 Indian Kannada-language romantic drama film directed by Om Prakash Rao and produced by Oscar Films. The film features Ramesh Aravind, Shiva Rajkumar and Raasi in lead roles.

The film was a remake of director Rajakumaran's Tamil film Nee Varuvai Ena (1999).

Cast 
 Ramesh Aravind as Kalyan
 Shiva Rajkumar as Srinivas
 Raasi as Meghamala
 Lokesh
 Sharan as Rajesh
 Mukhyamantri Chandru
 Sihi Kahi Chandru
 Chitra Shenoy
 Sadhu Kokila
 Dingri Nagaraj
 Srilalitha

Soundtrack 
The soundtrack of the film was composed by Rajesh Ramanath with the lyrics by K. Kalyan. All the tunes from Tamil film is retained.

Reception 
A critic from Viggy wrote that "However, 'Ninne Preethisuve' is a genuine attempt to mean different at least in the climax and story line".

References

External links 

 Movie portal

2002 films
2000s Kannada-language films
Films scored by Rajesh Ramnath
Indian romantic drama films
Kannada remakes of Tamil films
Films directed by Om Prakash Rao
2002 romantic drama films